Malone (also Mudville) is an unincorporated community in Morgan County, Kentucky, United States.  It lies along Route 191 south of the city of West Liberty, the county seat of Morgan County.  Its elevation is 797 feet (242 m).  It has a post office with the ZIP code 41451.

References

Unincorporated communities in Morgan County, Kentucky
Unincorporated communities in Kentucky